Frommel is the surname of:
 Emil Frommel (1828-1896), German theologian and author
 Gaston Frommel (1862 - 1906), Swiss theologian, professor of theology
 Karl Ludwig Frommel (1789 – 1863), German landscape painter and engraver
 Richard Frommel (1854 - 1912), German obstetrician and gynecologist

See also
 Hyperprolactinaemia, Chiari-Frommel syndrome